Abdul Iyodo (born 10 October 1979) is a Nigerian former professional footballer who played as a striker.

Career
Iyodo started his senior career with Kano Pillars. He first moved to Europe in 1996 joining French club FC Martigues. In 1999, he signed with German club SG Wattenscheid 09 where he scored 36 goals in three years and attracted offers from professional clubs in 2002. After a move to FC St. Pauli fell through, he joined Schalke 04's reserves. At Schalke he had disciplinary problems and made six appearances for the first team.

After that, he played for German clubs Karlsruher SC, SG Wattenscheid 09, and SV Elversberg. In December 2008, Elversberg announced Iyodo was free to find a new club. After the 2008–09 season, he played for the club's reserve team.

From 2010 he played for lower-league clubs CSV Bochum-Linden, Holzwickeder SC, SG Wattenscheid 09 II, SW Eppendorf, 1. SG Regental, and TSV Nittenau.

References

External links
 

1979 births
Living people
Association football forwards
Nigerian footballers
Nigerian expatriate footballers
Expatriate footballers in Germany
Expatriate footballers in France
Nigerian expatriate sportspeople in Germany
Nigerian expatriate sportspeople in France
Bundesliga players
2. Bundesliga players
Regionalliga players
Kano Pillars F.C. players
FC Martigues players
SV Elversberg players
SG Wattenscheid 09 players
FC Schalke 04 II players
FC Schalke 04 players
Karlsruher SC players
Sportspeople from Kano